The St. Louis Plantation is a Southern plantation with a historic mansion located in Iberville Parish, Louisiana, United States.

Built in 1858, the mansion was a replacement for a previous house named Erwin's Castle which was built in 1808 at the same location and was destroyed by a flood in the early 1850s. The two story frame cottage, covered with clapboards, is sitting on a brick basement. It shows elements of Greek Revival and Italianate architecture.

It was listed on the National Register of Historic Places on December 3, 1975.

See also
National Register of Historic Places listings in Iberville Parish, Louisiana
Edward James Gay

References

Plantation houses in Louisiana
Houses in Iberville Parish, Louisiana
Houses on the National Register of Historic Places in Louisiana
National Register of Historic Places in Iberville Parish, Louisiana